José Manuel Fernández Santiago (born 30 April 1958) is a Spanish politician and lawyer. He is a member of the People's Party. He was the president of the Cortes of Castile and León from 2003 to 2011. He is current deputy of the Cortes of Castile and León by Ávila since 1991. He was minister of health of the Junta of Castile and León from 1991 to 1999. He is a patron of the villar foundation. He was the first vice president of Junta of Castile and León for 3 years. He was the councilor for development in Junta of Castile and León.

Biography
José was born in Arenas de San Pedro, Spain on 30 April 1958. He is married and with two children's. He studied at the University of Salamanca. He graduated in law from the University of Salamanca in 1975-1980. He also graduated from the Salamanca School of legal practice.

References 

1958 births
Living people
20th-century Spanish politicians
21st-century Spanish politicians
People's Party (Spain) politicians
University of Salamanca alumni
Presidents of the Cortes of Castile and León